Tigran (in Armenian: Տիգրան) (in Western Armenian pronounced Dikran) is an Armenian given name. The historical name is Tigranes, primarily kings of Armenia.

Tigran and Dikran may refer to:

Given name
Tigran Begoyan (born 1948), Armenian middle weight boxing champion between 1968-1978
Tigran Gharabaghtsyan (born 1984), Armenian football (soccer) player
Tigran Gharamian (born 1984), Armenian chess player and grandmaster
Tigran Hamasyan (born 1987), Armenian jazz pianist
Tigran Hekekyan (born 1959), Armenian professor of music and conductor
Tigran Keosayan (born 1966), Russian-Armenian film director, actor and writer
Tigran Khzmalyan (also Xmalian), independent Armenian filmmaker, screenwriter and producer
Tigran Mansurian (born 1939), Armenian composer of classical music and film scores
Tigran Martirosyan (tennis) (born 1983), Armenian tennis player
Tigran Gevorg Martirosyan (born 1988), Armenian weightlifter 
Tigran Vardan Martirosyan (born 1983), Armenian weightlifter who competes in the 85kg category
Tigran Nagdalian (died 2002), Armenian journalist
Tigran Ouzlian (born 1968), Greek-Armenian amateur boxer
Tigran Petrosian (1929–1984), Soviet Armenian grandmaster and World Chess Champion
Tigran L. Petrosian (born 1984), Armenian chess player and grandmaster
Tigran Petrosyants (born 1973), Armenian football (soccer) player
Tigran Sargsyan (born 1960), Prime Minister of Armenia
Tigran Chukhajian (1837-1898), Armenian composer, conductor, public activist and the founder of the first opera institution in the Ottoman Empire
Tigran Torosyan (born 1956), Armenian politician, speaker of the National Assembly of Armenia from 2006 to 2008
Tigran Vardanjan (born 1989), Russian-Armenian figure skater who competes internationally for Hungary
Tigran Yesayan (born 1972), Armenian football (soccer) player and coach

Dikran
 Dikran Chökürian (1884-1915), Armenian writer and teacher, newspaper editor, a victim of Armenian Genocide
 Dikran Kelekian (1868–1951), collector and dealer of Islamic art
 Dikran Kouyoumdjian (1895–1956), pen name Michael Arlen, American Armenian writer, novelist
 Dikran Tahta (1928–2006), British-Armenian mathematician, teacher and author

Family name
Aram Tigran or Aramê Dîkran, born Aram Melikyan (1934–2009), contemporary Armenian singer who sang primarily in Kurdish, but also Armenian and Syriac/Assyrian

Armenian masculine given names